The 2015 East–West Shrine Game, the 90th staging of the all-star college football exhibition, was held on January 17, 2015, at 4:00 PM EST, and featured NCAA Division I Football Bowl Subdivision players and a few select invitees from Canadian university football. The game featured more than 100 players from the 2014 NCAA Division I FBS football season and prospects for the 2015 Draft of the professional National Football League (NFL). In the week prior to the game, scouts from all 32 NFL teams attended. The game was held in St. Petersburg, Florida, at Tropicana Field, and benefits Shriners Hospitals for Children. The game was broadcast on the NFL Network.

The East–West Shrine Game Pat Tillman Award was given to Jake Ryan (LB, Michigan); the award "is presented to a player who best exemplifies character, intelligence, sportsmanship and service. The award is about a student-athlete's achievements and conduct, both on and off the field."

Players
Full roster is available here.

East Team

Offense

Defense

Specialists

West Team

Offense

Defense

Specialists

Game summary

Scoring summary

Statistics

Notes
 Former players Jim Hanifan (1955 game) and Tommie Frazier (1996 game) were selected for the East–West Shrine Game Hall of Fame.

2015 NFL Draft

References

East-West Shrine Game
East–West Shrine Bowl
American football in Florida
Sports competitions in St. Petersburg, Florida
January 2015 sports events in the United States
East-West Shrine Game